The 2011–12 season is Hapoel Tel Aviv's 71st season in Israeli Premier League, and their 22nd consecutive season in the top division of Israeli football.

This season the club was eliminated from the group stage of the Europa League.

This season the club get -3 point on the league

UEFA Europa League

Qualification

Group C

Ligat Ha'Al (Premier League)

Regular season

Top playoff

State Cup

Toto Cup

Group C

Knockout phase

See also

Hapoel Tel Aviv F.C. seasons
Hapoel Tel Aviv
Hapoel Tel Aviv